SS Pacific was the name of a number of steamships, including:

Ship names